Kelly Depeault (born May 6 2002) is a Canadian actress from Sherbrooke, Quebec.

Biography 
Originally from the Eastern Townships region, Kelly Depeault enjoyed re-enacting movie scenes as a child. She was introduced to singing by her older sister, Lydia Dépeault, before joining Les Petits Chanteurs de Trois-Rivières choir.

In 2013, she made her first television appearance in the show En route vers le gala Artis. That same year, she landed the lead role in a Leucan commercial, before joining the cast of Les Enfants Roy in 2014. At the same time, she won several singing competitions, where she made a name for herself with a song written for her, called Raconte-moi encore.

In 2016, Depeault began her career in television, participating in the series L'Échappée in the role of Claudie. She acted in various short films including Le dernier jour (2018) and Vacarme (2019).

Depeault is most noted for her performance in the 2020 film Goddess of the Fireflies (La déesse des mouches à feu), for which she won the Prix Iris for Revelation of the Year at the 23rd Quebec Cinema Awards in 2021. In 2023, she received a Canadian Screen Award nomination for Best Lead Performance in a Film at the 11th Canadian Screen Awards, for her performance in Noemie Says Yes (Noémie dit oui).

Filmography

Television 

 Since 2016 : L'Échappée by Myriam Bouchard, François Bégin and Yan England: Claudie Lyndsay
 2019: OFF : Marie-Noëlle

Cinema 

 2018 : Le dernier jour by Louis-Charles Blais : Lorence (short film)
 2019 : Vacarme by Frédérick Neegan Trudel: Arielle (short film)
 2019 : Je suis amoureuse de mes souvenirs by Etienne Galloy : Florence (short film)
 2021 : Goddess of the Fireflies (La Déesse des mouches à feu) by Anaïs Barbeau-Lavalette : Catherine
 2021 : North of Albany by Marianne Farley : Martine
 2022 : Noemie Says Yes (Noémie dit oui) by Geneviève Albert : Noémie

References

External links

21st-century Canadian actresses
Canadian television actresses
Canadian film actresses
Actresses from Quebec
French Quebecers
Living people
People from Sherbrooke
2002 births